Counties 4 Yorkshire is an English rugby union league at the tenth tier of the domestic competition for teams from Yorkshire. Club rugby in Yorkshire operates without promotion play-offs meaning that the top two teams are automatically promoted to Yorkshire 3 and the bottom two teams were relegated to Yorkshire 5 until the RFU made changes to the Yorkshire league structure. Each season a team from Counties 3 Yorkshire or Yorkshire 4 may be picked to take part in the RFU Junior Vase - a national competition for clubs at levels 9-12.   

For the 2017-18 season, Yorkshire 4 was broken up into two regional leagues - Yorkshire 4 (North West) and Yorkshire 4 (South East) - while Yorkshire 5 ceased to exist.  Teams from both Yorkshire 4 and 5 were transferred into the regional divisions depending on location. After the teams have played each other home and away, in February the clubs are reallocated into a Premier league and a Shield league for one further round of fixtures. The top four teams from each league play in the Premier and the other teams play in the Shield. The top two teams in the Premier league are promoted to Counties 3 Yorkshire.

Participating clubs 2021-22

The teams competing in 2021-22 achieved their places in the league based on performances in 2019-20, the 'previous season' column in the table below refers to that season not 2020-21.

North West division

York RI and Nestle Rowntree were level transferred from Yorkshire 4 South East for the current season.

South East division

Season 2020–21

On 30 October 2020 the RFU announced  that due to the coronavirus pandemic a decision had been taken to cancel Adult Competitive Leagues (National League 1 and below) for the 2020/21 season meaning Yorkshire 4 was not contested.

Participating clubs 2019-20

North West division

South East division

Premier and Shield divisions

Premier participants
Bramley Phoenix
Burley
Halifax
Leeds Modernians
Mosborough
Stanley Rodillians
Stocksbridge
York Railway Institute

Shield participants
Hessle
Knaresborough
Leeds Medics & Dentists
Nestle Rowntree
Sheffield Oaks
Thirsk

Participating clubs 2018-19

North West division

South East division

Premier and Shield divisions

Premier participants
Bramley Phoenix
Hessle
Knaresborough
Leeds Medics & Dentisists
Mosborough
Ossett
Wibsey
York Railway Institute

Shield participants
Burley
Halifax
Nestle Rowntree
Sheffield Oaks
Stanley Rodilians
Stocksbridge
Thirsk

Participating clubs 2017-18

North West division

South East division

Premier and Shield divisions

In February, after the teams have played each other home and away, the clubs in both Yorkshire 4 leagues are reallocated into a Premier league and a Shield league for one further round of fixtures. The top four teams from each league play in the Premier and the other teams play in the Shield.

Premier participants
Burley
Knaresborough
Leeds Corinthians
Mosborough
Ossett
Rotherham Phoenix
Stanley Rodillians
Wibsey

Shield participants
Bramley Phoenix
Halifax
Hessle
Sheffield Oaks
Thirsk
York RI

Rossington Hornets did not participate in the Shield competition.

Participating clubs 2016-17
Bramley Phoenix (relegated from Yorkshire 3)
Burley
Hemsworth 
Hessle
Hornsea (promoted from Yorkshire 5)
Leeds Corinthians	
Ossett	
Rotherham Clifton
Rotherham Phoenix (relegated from Yorkshire 3)
Skipton 
Stanley Rodillians (promoted from Yorkshire 5)
York Railway Institute

Participating clubs 2015-16
Burley (relegated from Yorkshire 3)
Halifax Vandals
Hemsworth (relegated from Yorkshire 3)
Hessle (promoted from Yorkshire 5)	
Leeds Corinthians	
Mosborough	
Ossett	
Rotherham Clifton (promoted from Yorkshire 5)
Sheffield Oaks	
Skipton 
Wensleydale 
York Railway Institute

Participating clubs 2014-15
Halifax
Halifax Vandals
Hornsea	
Knaresborough	(promoted from Yorkshire 5)
Leeds Corinthians	
Mosborough	
Ossett	
Sheffield Oaks	
Skipton (relegated from Yorkshire 3)
Wensleydale (promoted from Yorkshire 5)
Wetherby
York Railway Institute

Participating clubs 2013-14
Halifax
Halifax Vandals
Hessle (relegated from Yorkshire 3)
Hornsea
Leeds Corinthians
Mosborough
Old Otliensians	
Ossett
Sheffield Oaks	(promoted from Yorkshire 5)
Stocksbridge (promoted from Yorkshire 5)	
Wetherby	
York Railway Institute (relegated from Yorkshire 3)

Participating clubs 2012–13
Halifax
Halifax Vandals
Harrogate Pythons
Hornsea
Knaresborough
Leeds Corinthians
Marist
Mosborough
Old Grovians
Old Otliensians
Ossett
Wetherby

Original teams
When league rugby began in 1987 this division contained the following teams:

Burley
Dinnington 
Hessle
Hullensians
Leeds YMCA
Old Modernians
Skipton
West Leeds
Wetherby
Wibsey
Yorkshire CW

Yorkshire 4

Yorkshire 4 (1987–1993)

The original Yorkshire 4 was a tier 12 league with promotion up to Yorkshire 3 and relegation down to Yorkshire 5.

Yorkshire 4 (1993–2000)

The creation of National 5 North for the 1993–94 season meant that Yorkshire 4 dropped to become a tier 13 league.  A further restructure at the end of the 1995–96 season, which included the cancellation of National 5 North and the addition of North East 3 at tier 9, saw Yorkshire 4 remain at tier 13.

Yorkshire 4 (2000–present)

Northern league restructuring by the RFU at the end of the 1999-2000 season saw the cancellation of North East 1, North East 2 and North East 3 (tiers 7-9).  This meant that Yorkshire 4 became a tier 10 league.

Number of league titles

Hessle (2)
Hullensians (2)
Old Rishworthians (2)
Rotherham Phoenix (2)
Stocksbridge (2)
Wibsey (2)
Aireborough (1)
Barnsley (1)
Bradford Salem (1)
Bramley Phoenix (1)
Halifax Vandals (1)
Heath (1)
Hemsworth (1)
Knottingley (1)
Leeds Medics & Dentists (1)
Mosborough (1)
Northallerton (1)
Old Grovians (1)
Old Modernians (1)
Old Otliensians (1)
Ossett (1)
Phoenix Park (1)
Roundhegians (1)
Sheffield Medicals (1)
Wath Upon Dearne (1)
Wetherby (1)
York Railway Institute (1)

Notes

See also
Yorkshire RFU
English rugby union system
Rugby union in England

References

10
Recurring sporting events established in 1987
Sports leagues established in 1987
Rugby union competitions in Yorkshire